Phyllonorycter pseudojoviella is a moth of the family Gracillariidae. It is known from Tunisia and Algeria.

The larvae feed on Quercus coccifera and Quercus ilex. They mine the leaves of their host plant. The mine is found on the upperside of the leaf.

References

pseudojoviella
Moths of Africa
Moths described in 1974